The 2012 WNBA season is the 16th season for the Phoenix Mercury of the Women's National Basketball Association.

Transactions

WNBA Draft
The following are the Mercury's selections in the 2012 WNBA Draft.

Transaction log
April 11, 2011: The Mercury acquired a third-round pick in the 2012 Draft from the Connecticut Sun in exchange for Tahnee Robinson's draft rights.
January 12: The Mercury traded Temeka Johnson to the Tulsa Shock in exchange for Andrea Riley.
February 2: The Mercury acquired Alexis Hornbuckle from the Minnesota Lynx in exchange for a second-round pick in the 2013 Draft.
February 9: The Mercury signed Chastity Reed.
February 28: The Mercury traded the 18th pick in the 2012 Draft to the Minnesota Lynx in exchange for Charde Houston and the 24th pick in the 2012 Draft.
April 11: The Mercury signed Zane Tamane and Brittney Thomas.
April 13: The Mercury signed Dymond Simon.
April 13: The Mercury announced Marie Ferdinand-Harris' retirement.
April 26: The Mercury signed Avery Warley.
May 2: The Mercury signed draft picks Christine Flores, Amanda Johnson, Samantha Prahalis, and C'eira Ricketts.
May 3: The Mercury waived Brittney Thomas.
May 8: The Mercury waived C'eira Ricketts and Christine Flores.
May 16: The Mercury waived Chastity Reed, Dymond Simon, Krystal Thomas, and Amanda Johnson.
May 25: The Mercury signed Krystal Thomas and waived Zane Tamane.
June 2: The Mercury signed Andrea Riley.
July 1: The Mercury waived Andrea Riley.
July 5: The Mercury signed Lynetta Kizer to a seven-day contract.

Trades

Personnel changes

Additions

Subtractions

Roster

Depth

Season standings

Schedule

Preseason

|- align="center" bgcolor="bbffbb"
| 1 || Tue 8 || 10:00 || Japan ||  || 102-73 || Gray-Lawson (34) || TamaneWarley (13) || Prahalis (7) || US Airways Center  2,752 || 1-0
|-

Regular season

|- align="center" bgcolor="ffbbbb"
| 1 || Sun 20 || 12:30 || @ Minnesota || ABC || 83-105 || Houston (24) || Sanford (6) || Prahalis (6) || Target Center  12,611 || 0-1
|- align="center" bgcolor="bbffbb"
| 2 || Tue 22 || 8:00 || @ Tulsa ||  || 89-87 || Dupree (31) || Dupree (9) || Prahalis (7) || BOK Center  5,341 || 1-1
|- align="center" bgcolor="ffbbbb"
| 3 || Sat 26 || 10:00 || Los Angeles || FS-A+KDOC || 88-99 || Dupree (24) || Warley (9) || Taurasi (4) || US Airways Center  10,200 || 1-2
|- align="center" bgcolor="ffbbbb"
| 4 || Thu 31 || 7:00 || @ Atlanta || FS-ASSO || 65-81 || Bonner (22) || Bonner (10) || Prahalis (6) || Philips Arena  4,887 || 1-3
|-

|- align="center" bgcolor="ffbbbb"
| 5 || Fri 1 || 8:00 || @ San Antonio ||  || 66-85 || BonnerDupree (17) || Dupree (10) || Prahalis (9) || AT&T Center  6,534 || 1-4
|- align="center" bgcolor="bbffbb"
| 6 || Sun 3 || 6:00 || Tulsa ||  || 79-72 || Bonner (23) || Bonner (13) || Prahalis (6) || US Airways Center  7,178 || 2-4
|- align="center" bgcolor="ffbbbb"
| 7 || Fri 8 || 11:00 || @ Los Angeles || TWC101 || 74-90 || Houston (22) || BonnerGray-Lawson (6) || Prahalis (6) || Staples Center  11,198 || 2-5
|- align="center" bgcolor="ffbbbb"
| 8 || Fri 15 || 10:00 || Minnesota ||  || 60-78 || Bonner (18) || Dupree (10) || Prahalis (4) || US Airways Center  7,394 || 2-6
|- align="center" bgcolor="ffbbbb"
| 9 || Sun 17 || 4:00 || @ Tulsa ||  || 75-87 || Bonner (24) || Bonner (9) || Prahalis (6) || BOK Center  4,200 || 2-7
|- align="center" bgcolor="bbffbb"
| 10 || Wed 20 || 10:00 || Washington ||  || 80-77 || Bonner (19) || Warley (9) || BonnerPrahalis (3) || US Airways Center  5,751 || 3-7
|- align="center" bgcolor="ffbbbb"
| 11 || Sat 23 || 8:00 || Los Angeles || ESPN || 84-93 || Bonner (24) || Thomas (11) || Prahalis (5) || US Airways Center  9,670 || 3-8
|- align="center" bgcolor="ffbbbb"
| 12 || Wed 27 || 8:00 || @ Minnesota || FS-A+ || 80-96 || Bonner (23) || BonnerWarley (7) || Prahalis (3) || Target Center  9,674 || 3-9
|- align="center" bgcolor="bbffbb"
| 13 || Fri 29 || 8:30 || @ Chicago || CN100 || 84-81 || Bonner (27) || Thomas (11) || HoustonPrahalis (4) || Allstate Arena  5,488 || 4-9
|-

|- align="center" bgcolor="ffbbbb"
| 14 || Sun 1 || 4:00 || @ Washington || CSN-MA || 77-90 || Houston (26) || BonnerThomas (8) || Prahalis (5) || Verizon Center  10,789 || 4-10
|- align="center" bgcolor="ffbbbb"
| 15 || Tue 3 || 8:00 || @ San Antonio || NBATV || 81-82 || Bonner (38) || BonnerThomas (8) || Prahalis (5) || AT&T Center  6,912 || 4-11
|- align="center" bgcolor="ffbbbb"
| 16 || Sat 7 || 10:00 || Atlanta ||  || 93-100 (2OT) || Bonner (27) || Bonner (15) || HornbucklePrahalisThomas (4) || US Airways Center  7,948 || 4-12
|- align="center" bgcolor="ffbbbb"
| 17 || Sun 8 || 9:00 || @ Seattle ||  || 68-83 || Bonner (12) || Warley (13) || Bonner (3) || KeyArena  8,639 || 4-13
|- align="center" bgcolor="ffbbbb"
| 18 || Tue 10 || 3:30 || Los Angeles || FS-A || 71-90 || BonnerPrahalis (14) || 5 players (7) || Hornbuckle (3) || US Airways Center  9,336 || 4-14
|- align="center" bgcolor="ffbbbb"
| 19 || Fri 13 || 10:00 || Seattle ||  || 64-83 || Bonner (18) || Hornbuckle (8) || Hornbuckle (5) || US Airways Center  7,647 || 4-15
|-
| colspan="11" align="center" valign="middle" | Summer Olympic break
|-

|-
| colspan="11" align="center" valign="middle" | Summer Olympic break
|- align="center" bgcolor="ffbbbb"
| 20 || Thu 16 || 10:00 || @ Seattle || KONG || 58-72 || Prahalis (15) || Thomas (11) || Bonner (4) || KeyArena  6,987 || 4-16
|- align="center" bgcolor="ffbbbb"
| 21 || Sun 19 || 6:00 || San Antonio || FS-AFS-SW || 47-89 || Hornbuckle (11) || HornbuckleThomas (7) || Prahalis (4) || US Airways Center  10,656 || 4-17
|- align="center" bgcolor="ffbbbb"
| 22 || Thu 23 || 10:00 || New York ||  || 77-89 || Bonner (34) || Thomas (14) || Prahalis (4) || US Airways Center  7.039 || 4-18
|- align="center" bgcolor="ffbbbb"
| 23 || Sat 25 || 10:00 || Indiana ||  || 72-85 || Taurasi (19) || BonnerThomasWarley (9) || BonnerTaurasi (3) || US Airways Center  9,079 || 4-19
|- align="center" bgcolor="bbffbb"
| 24 || Thu 30 || 10:00 || @ Seattle || KONG || 75-68 || Bonner (24) || Bonner (11) || Prahalis (6) || KeyArena  6,379 || 5-19
|-

|- align="center" bgcolor="bbffbb"
| 25 || Sat 1 || 10:00 || San Antonio || NBATV || 94-90 || Taurasi (25) || Bonner (9) || Prahalis (5) || US Airways Center  5,964 || 6-19
|- align="center" bgcolor="ffbbbb"
| 26 || Wed 5 || 7:00 || @ New York || NBATVMSG || 59-87 || Bonner (20) || HornbuckleGilbreath (7) || Hornbuckle (5) || Prudential Center  4,732 || 6-20
|- align="center" bgcolor="bbffbb"
| 27 || Fri 7 || 7:00 || @ Connecticut || CPTV-S || 91-82 || Bonner (35) || Thomas (16) || Hornbuckle (5) || Mohegan Sun Arena  8,379 || 7-20
|- align="center" bgcolor="ffbbbb"
| 28 || Sun 9 || 6:00 || @ Indiana || NBATVFS-A+FS-I || 83-89 || Bonner (23) || Hornbuckle (9) || Bonner (5) || Bankers Life Fieldhouse  7,971 || 7-21
|- align="center" bgcolor="ffbbbb"
| 29 || Wed 12 || 10:00 || Connecticut || ESPN2CPTV-S || 78-100 || Bonner (24) || Bonner (10) || Simon (4) || US Airways Center  5,421 || 7-22
|- align="center" bgcolor="ffbbbb"
| 30 || Fri 14 || 10:00 || Tulsa ||  || 84-92 || Kizer (19) || Thomas (11) || Simon (6) || US Airways Center  6,719 || 7-23
|- align="center" bgcolor="ffbbbb"
| 31 || Sun 16 || 6:00 || Chicago || NBATVCN100 || 55-86 || Houston (15) || Thomas (13) || Houston (3) || US Airways Center  8,044 || 7-24
|- align="center" bgcolor="ffbbbb"
| 32 || Tue 18 || 10:30 || @ Los Angeles || NBATVTWC101 || 76-101 || Bonner (23) || Thomas (11) || Bonner (6) || Staples Center  8,579 || 7-25
|- align="center" bgcolor="ffbbbb"
| 33 || Fri 21 || 10:00 || Minnesota || NBATVFS-A+ || 66-89 || Bonner (17) || Thomas (11) || Prahalis (8) || US Airways Center  7,217 || 7-26
|- align="center" bgcolor="ffbbbb"
| 34 || Sun 23 || 3:00 || Seattle || ESPN2 || 57-71 || Bonner (13) || Thomas (18) || Prahalis (6) || US Airways Center  7,576 || 7-27
|-

| All games are viewable on WNBA LiveAccess or ESPN3.com

Statistics

Regular season

Awards and honors

References

External links

Phoenix Mercury seasons
Phoenix
Phoenix Mercury